is a Japanese musician, composer, sound artist, sound designer and producer.

Biography 
Masato Hatanaka is a composer who conceives the concept of haute couture sound on his quest for the way sound should be. He creates works in the various fields of Art, Architecture, Design and the Performing Arts. His notable works in 2011 include music compositions for the ISSEY MIYAKE Paris Collection, CANON "NEOREAL WONDER" at Milano Salone.

Ballet music 
 Arise
Choreograph : Yaroslav Ivanenko, Heather Jurgensen
Dance: Heather Jurgensen
Music: Masato Hatanaka
Nostalgia
Choreography: Yaroslav Ivanenko (Hamburg Ballet)
Dance: Yaroslav Ivanenko
Music: Masato Hatanaka
Prisoners of Feelings
World premiere: Copenhagen, Denmark, 2003
Choreography: Jiří Bubeníček
Dance: Otto Bubeníček and Jiří Bubeníček
Music: Masato Hatanaka
Trip
World premiere: Hamburg, Germany, 2003
Choreography:  Jiří Bubeníček
Music: Masato Hatanaka
Bolero 2
World premiere: Iwamizawa-City, Japan, 2001
Choreography: Jiří Bubeníček
Music, Arrangement, Conductor: Masato Hatanaka

TV commercials 
SONY Japan (sound logo/2009)
Canada Dry Japan (music – enjoy version, Relax version/2009)
Sprite Zero Japan (music/2007)
IHI (music – white world version/2007)
ST (sound logo /2007)
Mobile Car Graphic (music/2004)
K-SAY Driving School (music/1998)
Quick Shaken (music/1996)

Web 
Sharp [Aquos – Vision] International website, 2007 (music and sound design)
 JT [my resort moment] website, 2007 (music and sound design)
 [Towako lab] website, 2007 (music and sound design)
Kracie shampoo [Ichikami garden] website, 2006 (music and sound design)
Designtide Tokyo 2006 (music and sound design)
Yamaha Digital Piano P series Special site "My style – Hatanaka meets P140s", 2005

Other advertising music 
JAL sky's promotion film, 2004
volkswagen Japan's promotion event, 2004
Louis Vuitton Japan's the 25th anniversary event, 2004
Adidas Golf's new-logo-release exhibition, 2003
J-phone's original signature music and sound design, 2002
Hokkaido Institute of Technology's radio CM music, 2000
Fits [entroop] promotion film, 1999 (music and sound design)

Stages, event and live performance 
[matohu 09 S/S Collection] fashion show in Tokyo, 2008
Fkikoshi Solo Act Live "XVII in Japan, 2006
[matohu 07 S/S Collection] fashion show in Tokyo, 2006
The Nitten's opening ceremony in Tokyo, 2006
Live performance in DesigtningG 2006's opening ceremony in Fukuoka, Japan 2006
[him | misa harada men's hat A/W 06-07 collection] fashion show in Tokyo, 2006
Short Short Film Festival 2006 – music for opening ceremony
Short Short Film Festival Asia 2006 – music for opening ceremony
BMW "A History of Innovation seen in Vintage Cars" Live performance in Tokyo, 2006
Lebel Congress 2005 – Live performance in Tokyo, 2005
rooms 10 – Live performance in Tokyo, 2005
Elly Lin "botanical fan tas mo" – Live performance in Sapporo, 2004
Solo Live in "Japan – Contemporary Ceramics and photography" in Hamburg, 2003
7th festival Beyond Innocence 2003 in Osaka
Solo Live in "Die lange Nacht der Museen in Hamburg" in Hamburg, 2002
Solo Live in Rikuo Ueda exhibition "wind drawing" in Hamburg, 2002
Live performance in Satoshi Hata and Fumiki Bando exhibition "226" in Hamburg, 2002
Ryoji Hojito (piano) and Masato Hatanaka (sampler) Live performance in Sapporo, 2002
Live performance in "Toru Iwashita – Sokkyo" in Hokkaido, Japan 2002
"Demeter" Tokachi International Contemporary Art Exhibition, Obihiro, Japan 2002
Live performance in "ICC (Intercross creative center) Opening event" in Sapporo, 2001
Opening Act performance in "Carl Stone + Otomo Yoshihide" in Sapporo, 2001
Live performance in "Immaculate Concept in Sapporo Art Park 2001"
Live performance in "Sapporo Dome Opening Series" 2001
Live performance in "MIX 2000" in Sapporo
Live performance in "UKA" in Sapporo, 2000
Kive performed in "ArtNova Vol.2" in Tokyo, 2000
Live performance in "Dance Weeks '00" in Sapporo
Trio Live at G claf, Sapporo, Japan 2000 (Vocal : Dmitri Prigov / Piano : Ryoji Hojito / Sampler : Masato Hatanaka)
Japan year in Germany official program "Cultural Exchange From entrance to entrance" in Hamburg, 1999
Dance Weeks'99 in Sapporo, 1999 (music and sound)
Live performance in "Orunament" in Sapporo, 1998
Live performance in "Night Portor" in Sapporo, 1998
Kenji Hirato Dance Performance "Sola To Ashioto" in Sapporo, 1998
Sapporo Art Park Summer Ballet Seminar '98 (Prix de Lausanne) in Sapporo, 1998
Live performance in "Immaculate concept" Fashion show in Hamburg, 1998
Live performance in "Dance Weeks' 98" in Sapporo, 1998
Solo Live in Hamburg, 1998
Solo Live and Session with Fake Sweet in Sapporo, 1997
Solo Live and Session with Masaya Kimura in Sapporo, 1997
Live performance in "Fashion Project 1" in Sapporo Art Paradise, 1997
Kenji Hirato Dance Performance "Ishi Ni Muku Ishi" in Sapporo, 1996 (music and sound design)
Modern Ballet "The Circus Story" in Sapporo, 1995 (music)
Live performance in"Non Rule Fashion Show" in Sapporo, 1995
Live performance in "Poromanta 1" in Sapporo, 1995
Live performance in "Ripple Across the Water" in Tokyo, 1995

Space and exhibition 
"Infinity" Citizen × Wow in Baselworld 2009, Switzerland
Curiosity Exhibition Light-Light at LV Hall Louis Vuitton Omotesando in Tokyo, Japan, 2009
Kansai International Airport in Japan, 2009
[Istanbul and Beyond] Tabanlioglu Architects×W0W movie Installation at RIBA in LONDON, 2008
Designtide Tokyo 2008 main site at Midtown Hall in Tokyo, 2008
Lexus International Gallery Aoyama in Tokyo, 2008
NEC – monolith at Tokyo Big Sight in Tokyo, 2008
[Curiosity×Tonerico – Tokyo Wonder] in Milano Salone, 2008
Directed by Issey Miyake [XXIc. – XXIst Century Man] at 21_21 Design Sight in Tokyo, 2008
E&Y show room in Tokyo, 2008
JR Hamamatsu Station in Japan, 2008
[This Play!] exhibition at 21_21 Design Sight in Tokyo, 2007
Yamaha design exhibition [scene of tone] in Milano Salone 2007
W0W movie installation [Tenspace] in TENT LONDON, 2007
Spa Girdish in Yokohama-city, Japan, 2007
Kakitsubata Bekkan Gallery in Tokyo, 2006
Makoto Azuma [Gyakuten no niwa 1] in Fukuoka, Japan, 2006
hpgrp exhibition in Tokyo, Japan, 2006
Yasushi Furuhata exhibition "a-R-T" in Tokyo, 2002 (sound design)
Sapporo Universal Art Exhibition "Peace Life", 2002 (sound design for Satoshi Hata's art work)
Sapporo dome permanent art work [Perfect World] with Satoshi Hata in Sapporo, Japan, 2001
Fumiki Bando exhibition in Sapporo, 2001 (sound design)
High Tide exhibition in Sapporo, 2001 (sound design for Satoshi Hata's art work)
METOD FRIC exhibition in Sapporo, 2000 (sound design)
Asia Print Adventure in Sapporo, 1998 (sound design for Satoshi Hata's art work)
Satoshi Hata solo exhibition "I am the editor" in Sapporo, 1997 (sound design)

Other music works 
Signature sound design for NTT docomo i-widget, mobile phone (2008)
Mitsuru Fkikoshi's DVD "mr. motion picture" (music)
H.P.Frace "Bijoux" (music)
Snowboard's DVD "TOXIC" (music)
Music for nextmaruni 12 chairs exhibition
CD produced for rock band "76 motorbike delivery service"
ElbtonalPercussion CD Album "Drumtronic with Christopher Dell" Remix for the Track 9
Apichatpong Weerasethakul's short film for Nokia Thailand (music)
Hamatonbetsu-cho kindergarten song (Lyrics and Music: Masato Hatanaka / 2003)

Album 
 USE (1995)
 Period (1997)
Ornament (1998)
Aida vol.1 (2001)
Ear opener 1 (2003)
Ear opener 2 (2003)
Piano (2003)
6 doors (2004)
10 colors play (2005)
clue (2007)
diary (2011)
Watering (2015)
ice of feelings (2017)

External links 
hatanakamasato.net Masato Hatanaka official homepage (English and Japanese)
Masato Hatanaka Youtube Channel (English and Japanese)
Masato Hatanaka SoundCloud

1975 births
20th-century classical composers
20th-century Japanese composers
21st-century classical composers
21st-century Japanese composers
Japanese classical composers
Japanese dance musicians
Japanese keyboardists
Japanese male classical composers
Living people
Musicians from Hokkaido
Japanese sound artists
20th-century Japanese male musicians
21st-century Japanese male musicians